Charles Wellington Furse, MA, JP (born Johnson; 16 April 1821 – 2 August 1900) was Archdeacon of Westminster from 1894  until his death.

Furse was the third son of Charles Wellington Johnson, of Great Torrington, Devon, and his wife Theresa Furze. In 1854, he changed his surname from Johnson to Furse in 1854, to inherit from his maternal uncle John Furze (Furse). He was educated at Eton and Balliol College, Oxford. He was ordained in 1848. After curacies at St Andrew the Apostle, Clewer and Christ Church, Albany Street he was Vicar of Staines. He was then Principal of Cuddesdon Theological College and concurrently Chaplain to the Bishop of Oxford. He was the incumbent at St John's, Smith Square, Westminster from 1883 until his appointment as Archdeacon of Westminster.

Marriage and issue
On 24 February 1859, Furse married Jane Diana Monsell, second daughter of John Samuel Bewley Monsell, vicar of Egham. They had ten children:
 John Henry Monsell Furse (6 March 1860 – 5 April 1950), sculptor
 Charles Cyril Furse (19 June 1861 – 21 March 1862)
 Elizabeth Diana Furse (1862–1939), married John Primatt Maud, Bishop of Kensington
 Mary Theresa Furse (1863–1952), married Charles Abraham, Bishop of Derby
 Lt.-Gen. Sir William Thomas Furse (1865–1953),
 Charles Wellington Furse (1868–1904), painter
 Rt. Rev. Bolton Michael Furse (1870–1955), Bishop of Pretoria and Bishop of St. Albans
 Margaret Furse
 Edith Furse (1874–1960), married Cecil Lubbock, Deputy Governor of the Bank of England
 John Monsell Furse (1877–1888)

Jane died in March 1877, and on 7 January 1880 Furse married Gertrude Louisa Barnett, daughter of Henry Barnett , and had two more children:
 Emily Katharine Furse (21 February 1881 – 8 July 1911)
 Herbert Reynolds Furse (31 January 1887 – 1956)

References

19th-century English Anglican priests
1821 births
People educated at Eton College
Alumni of Balliol College, Oxford
1900 deaths
English justices of the peace
Archdeacons of Westminster